Nesharnaymeh (also Romanized as Neshārnʿaymeh) is a village in Shoaybiyeh-ye Sharqi Rural District, Shadravan District, Shushtar County, Khuzestan Province, Iran. At the 2006 census, its population was 71, in 11 families.

References 

Populated places in Shushtar County